Geminiano Giacomelli (sometimes Jacomelli) (28 May 1692 – 25 January 1740) was an Italian composer.

Biography
Giacomelli was born in Piacenza.  In 1724 he was named to the post of Kapellmeister to the duke of Parma.  Beginning with the first performance of his opera Ipermestra, in 1724, he became one of the most popular opera composers of his era.  Between 1724 and 1740 he composed 19 operas.  His best known opera is Cesare in Egitto of 1735.  He also wrote a deal of sacred music, including eight psalm settings for tenor and bass, and some concertos with continuo.  In 1738 Giacomelli again became Kapellmeister, this time at the Basilica della Santa Casa in Loreto; he died in Loreto in 1740.

List of works

Operas
Ipermestra (Venice, 1724)
Catone in Utica (Vienna 1727; Teatro Ducale, Milan, 1736)
Scipione in Cartagine (Venice, 1728)
Zidiana (Milan, 1728)
Astianatte  (Alessandria, 1729)
Gianguir (Venice, 1729)
Lucio Papirio dittatore (Parma, 1729)
Scipione in Cartagine nuova (Parma, 1730)
Semiramide riconosciuta (Milan, 1730)
Annibale (Rome, 1731)
Epaminonda (Venice, 1732)
Rosbale (Rome, 1732)
Alessandro Severo (Piacenza, 1732)
Adriano in Siria (Venice, 1733)
Il Tigrane (Piacenza, 1733)
La caccia in Etolia (Vienna, 1733)
La Merope (Venice, 1734)
Artaserse (Teatro Pubblico, Pisa, 1734)
Cesare in Egitto (Milan, 1735)
Nitocri, regina d'Egitto (Rome, 1736)
Arsace (Prato, 1736)
Demetrio (Teatro Regio, Turin, 1736)
La costanza vincitrice in amore (dramma pastorale per musica – Parma, 1738)
Achille in Aulide (Teatro Argentina, Rome, 1739)

Pasticci
Lucio Papirio dittatore (music of Giacomelli and Handel) (King's Theatre, London, 1732)
Circe (Theatre am Gänsemarkt, Hamburg, 1734)

Recordings
Giacomelli Fiamma vorace: Opera Arias Flavio Ferri-Benedetti (countertenor) Musica Fiorita. Pan Classics.

References

Sources
 
 
 
 A. Della Corte and G.M. Gatti, Dizionario di musica, Paravia, 1956, pag. 255

External links

 

1692 births
1740 deaths
Italian Baroque composers
Italian male classical composers
Italian opera composers
Male opera composers
People from Piacenza
18th-century Italian composers
18th-century Italian male musicians